Ilona Brand (born 17 April 1958) is an East German luger who competed during the late 1970s and early 1980s. She won two medals in the women's singles event at the FIL European Luge Championships with a silver in 1979 and a bronze in 1980.

Brand also finished fifth in the women's singles event at the 1980 Winter Olympics in Lake Placid.

References

External links
List of European luge champions 
Wallenchinsky, David. (1984). "Luge: Women's Singles". In The Complete Book the Olympics: 1896–1980. New York: Penguin Books. p. 577.

1958 births
Living people
German female lugers
Lugers at the 1980 Winter Olympics
Olympic lugers of East Germany